Manimal is a French death metal band from Toulouse, comprising members of Psykup, Leiden and Sailenth.  The band members define their music as a cross between Faith No More and Cannibal Corpse, and have subsequently called their musical style "Open Death", a more avant-garde and musically progressive subgenre when compared to the music of more classical death metal acts.

Biography
The band was formed in June 2003, and played together for a short time before recording their first demo, consisting of four tracks which would appear on their following album, Eros and Thanatos, which came out in 2004 and met with some success.  The band began their first national tour, returning to the studio after a year to record their second album, Succube, which was released at the end of 2005.

Both albums were recorded at Studio des Milans in Ondres, Landes the same recording studio used by Gojira. Joe from Gojira appeared as a guest vocalist on the track Dead Meat on Eros & Thanatos.

After seven years, the band came back with the Multiplicity album in 2012, which they announced would be their last: they plan to disband after their last shows of 2012 due to the departure of their guitarist and main composer David Castel. A fan page has been created to call him back in the band, called the Manimal Shepherd and referring to the Sea Shepherd Conservation Society association supported, among others, by the band Gojira.

Discography
 Eros & Thanatos (2004)
 Succube (2005)
 Multiplicity (2012)

References

External links 
French-Metal.com review of all releases 
Review of Eros & Thanatos and Succube 

Musical groups from Occitania (administrative region)
Musical groups established in 2003